Choi Min-soo (born March 27, 1962) is a South Korean actor. He is known as one of the most acclaimed actors in South Korea.

Life and career 
Choi's family has been active in acting, and singing. Choi is the son of Choi Moo-ryong, a popular actor of the 1960s and 1970s, and Kang Hyo-shil, an actress. His maternal grandmother is Jeon Ok, referred to as 'Queen of Tears' for her excellence at acting for tragic dramas. His grandfather is Kang Hong-shik, an actor, a film director and singer active during the Japanese occupation period. Kang Hong-sik and Jeon Ok were the first married couple in Korean entertainment history. Kang went over to North Korea along with his daughter Kang Hyo-son who later became a famous actress of North Korea. Kang Hong-shik was honored as "Merited artist" as well.

Choi graduated from Lila Elementary School, Seongdong Middle School, Dongbuk High School and Seoul Arts College. Choi debuted to the film industry in 1985 with Son of God, a film adapted from Park Bong-seong's same titled manhwa.

Choi has three sisters and one half sister from his father's second marriage with Kim Ji-mee, and one little half brother and half sister from his father's other marriage.

Choi met his wife June Elizabeth Kang from an international Miss Korea Beauty Pageant in 1993 where Kang was being represented as Miss Canada. Choi proposed to Kang after a three-hour meeting and they were married June 18, 1994 in Seoul. They have two children, Christian (born 1996) and Benjamin (born 2001).

Controversies 

Choi took a voluntary leave from acting following a scandal in 2008. He was involved in an assault case in April 2008 after a street-side argument ended in violence. An elderly man saw Choi cursing at another driver and rebuked him. The situation escalated and Choi assaulted the man. The actor attempted to drive away, but the man grabbed onto the hood of the car and refused to let go. Choi was let go by police when the victim declined to press charges, but the public reaction was swift and condemning. The actor apologized profusely for his behavior and swore to live in exile in the mountains, away from his wife and children, for a year.

In 2015, Choi punched the main production director of the KBS variety show, A Look At Myself. Choi later withdrew from the program.

In 2019, Choi was sentenced to two years probation for retaliatory driving due to an incident which took place on September 17, 2018. Both Choi and the prosecution have appealed the sentence.

Filmography

Film
*Note; the whole list is referenced.

Television

Awards 

*Note; the whole list is referenced.
 2014 MBC Drama Awards: Golden Acting Award, Actor (Pride and Prejudice)
 2007 MBC Drama Awards: Golden Acting Award, Actor in a Historical Drama (The Legend)
 2004 MBC Drama Awards: Top Excellence Award, Actor (Han River Ballad)
 2001 37th Baeksang Arts Awards: Best Film Actor (Libera Me)
 2000 SBS Drama Awards: Big Star Award (Legends of Love)
 2000 37th Grand Bell Awards: Best Actor (Phantom: the Submarine)
 1996 19th Golden Cinematography Awards: Most Popular Actor
 1996 34th Grand Bell Awards: Best Actor (Terrorist)
 1995 SBS Drama Awards: Grand Prize/Daesang (Sandglass)
 1995 22nd Korea Broadcasting Awards: Best TV Actor (Sandglass)
 1995 16th Blue Dragon Film Awards: Best Actor, Popular Star Award (Terrorist)
 1995 31st Baeksang Arts Awards: Best TV Actor (Sandglass)
 1993 14th Blue Dragon Film Awards: Popular Star Award
 1993 31st Grand Bell Awards: Most Popular Actor
 1993 29th Baeksang Arts Awards: Best TV Actor (Walking Up to Heaven)
 1992 MBC Drama Awards: Excellence Award, Actor (What Is Love)
 1992 28th Baeksang Arts Awards: Most Popular TV Actor (What Is Love)
 1992 13th Blue Dragon Film Awards: Popular Star Award
 1991 12th Blue Dragon Film Awards: Popular Star Award
 1990 11th Blue Dragon Film Awards: Best Supporting Actor (North Korean Partisan in South Korea)
 1989 25th Baeksang Arts Awards: Best New Film Actor (Last Dance with Her)
 1987 11th Golden Cinematography Awards: Best New Actor (Long Journey & Tunnel)

References

External links 
 
 

1962 births
20th-century South Korean male actors
21st-century South Korean male actors
South Korean male film actors
South Korean male television actors
Living people
People from Seoul
Male actors from Seoul
Best New Actor Paeksang Arts Award (film) winners